Alain Meslet (born 8 February 1950 in Averton, Mayenne) was a French professional road bicycle racer. His sporting career began with La Hutte-Gitane.

Major results

1975
Boucles de la Mayenne 
1976
Grand Prix du Midi Libre
Winner stage 1
1st place overall
1977
Tour de France:
Winner stage 22B
10th place overall classification
1979
stage 2b Tour Cycliste du Tarn 
1980 
stage 2 Circuit Cycliste Sarthe - Pays de la Loire

External links 

Official Tour de France results for Alain Meslet

References 

1950 births
Living people
Sportspeople from Mayenne
French male cyclists
French Tour de France stage winners
Tour de France Champs Elysées stage winners
Cyclists from Pays de la Loire